Hamaciré Youba Diarra (born 24 March 1998) is a Malian professional footballer who plays as a midfielder for La Liga club Cádiz.

Club career

Red Bull Salzburg
Born in Bamako, Diarra started his career with the youth setup of local club Yeelen Olympique. In January 2018 he moved to Austrian Bundesliga club FC Red Bull Salzburg, with whom he signed a contract that ran until May 2022. However, he was soon after loaned to Second Division club SC Wiener Neustadt. In March 2018 he made his debut for Wiener Neustadt in the 2. Liga when he started against Floridsdorfer AC on the 23rd match day of the 2017–18 season. While with the club he helped them to a third place finish and qualification for the promotion play-off.

For the 2018–19 season Diarra was loaned to Austrian Bundesliga club TSV Hartberg. After suffering a cruciate ligament rupture, the loan contract was terminated in January 2019.

After six months on loan with TSV Hartberg, he returned to Red Bull Salzburg in January 2019. After recovering from his injury, in August 2019 he played for the first time for the Red Bull Salzburg reserve team, FC Liefering.

On 29 August 2019, Diarra was loaned out to FC St. Pauli for the 2019–20 season. After only three appearances for St. Pauli in the 2nd Bundesliga due to injury, his contract with the German club was terminated in January 2020 and he returned to Salzburg.

Diarra made his return from injury with FC Liefering during June 2020. On 11 June 2020, he scored his first goal as a professional in a 3–0 victory over Floridsdorfer AC. On 24 June 2020, Diarra scored another goal in a 4–1 victory over Wacker Innsbruck.

On 1 March 2021, Diarra moved to MLS side New York Red Bulls, on a loan deal. On 17 April 2021, Diarra made his debut for New York, appearing as a starter in a 2–1 loss to Sporting Kansas City.

On 8 January 2022, Diarra moved to TSV Hartberg on another six-month loan – his second stint at the club. He then returned to Salzburg for the 2022/23 season. He made seven Bundesliga appearances for Salzburg before the winter break.

Cádiz
On 27 December 2022, Diarra signed a four-and-a-half-year contract with La Liga side Cádiz CF.

Career statistics

References

External links

 
 
 

Living people
1998 births
Association football midfielders
Malian footballers
2. Liga (Austria) players
Austrian Football Bundesliga players
2. Bundesliga players
Major League Soccer players
La Liga players
SC Wiener Neustadt players
FC Liefering players
FC St. Pauli players
TSV Hartberg players
FC Red Bull Salzburg players
New York Red Bulls players
Cádiz CF players
Malian expatriate footballers
Malian expatriate sportspeople in Austria
Expatriate footballers in Austria
Malian expatriate sportspeople in Germany
Expatriate footballers in Germany
Malian expatriate sportspeople in the United States
Expatriate soccer players in the United States
Malian expatriate sportspeople in Spain
Expatriate footballers in Spain